is a retired Japanese female long-distance runner. She represented Japan at the 1992 Summer Olympics, finishing in 14th place in the women's 10,000 metres. She set her personal best (31.45.82) in the event in 1994.

Achievements

References
sports-reference

1971 births
Living people
Japanese female long-distance runners
Athletes (track and field) at the 1992 Summer Olympics
Olympic athletes of Japan
People from Gunma Prefecture
Asian Games medalists in athletics (track and field)
Asian Games bronze medalists for Japan
Athletes (track and field) at the 1994 Asian Games
Medalists at the 1994 Asian Games
Japanese female marathon runners
20th-century Japanese women
21st-century Japanese women